Samociążek  is a village in the administrative district of Gmina Koronowo, within Bydgoszcz County, Kuyavian-Pomeranian Voivodeship, in north-central Poland. It is located in the historic region of Kuyavia.

The village has a population of 320.

During the German occupation (World War II), sołtys of Samociążek (head of local administration) Bernard Ziołkowski was among Poles massacred by the Germans on October 5–6, 1939 in the forest near Buszkowo as part of the Intelligenzaktion.

References

Villages in Bydgoszcz County